Valentin Ngbogo (born 14 February 1969) is a Central African Republic former sprinter who competed in the men's 100m competition at the 1992 Summer Olympics. He recorded a 10.79, not enough to qualify for the next round past the heats. He also competed in the 200m contest, timing in at 21.51.

References

1969 births
Living people
Central African Republic male sprinters
Athletes (track and field) at the 1992 Summer Olympics
Olympic athletes of the Central African Republic